Omar Duke Holness (born 13 March 1994) is a Jamaican footballer who plays as a midfielder for  club Bath City and the Jamaican national team.

Holness played college soccer in the United States before being drafted by Major League Soccer outfit Real Salt Lake in 2016. He also played for USL team Bethlehem Steel before joining Darlington in 2019. In international football, he played for Jamaica at youth levels and has been capped five times for the senior team.

Career

College and amateur
On 22 May 2013, it was announced that Holness committed to the University of North Carolina.  In his first season with the Tar Heels, he made 20 appearances and finished the year with two goals and three assists.  One of his two goals came on 21 November in a 1-0 win over the University of South Florida in the first round of the NCAA Tournament.

Holness also spent time with Portland Timbers U23s in the USL Premier Development League.

Club career

Real Salt Lake 
Holness was drafted in the first round of the 2016 MLS SuperDraft (5th overall) by Real Salt Lake.

Bethlehem Steel 
In January 2018, Holness signed for Bethlehem Steel FC of the USL. Bethlehem Steel released Holness at the end of the 2018 season.

Darlington
Holness signed for English National League North (sixth-tier) club Darlington on his 25th birthday. He started in their next match, a 2–1 win away to Nuneaton Borough; he was involved in the first goal but was sent off late in the match for a second yellow card.

On 9 November 2019, Holness scored Darlington's first goal as they held League Two side Walsall to a 2–2 draw in the first round of the FA Cup. He also scored the winner as Darlington beat National League team Solihull Moors 1–0 in the FA Trophy first round replay. At the end of the curtailed season he was offered terms for a further season but did not accept, and left the club having made 34 National League North appearances. Holness rejoined Darlington on 16 October 2020 on non-contract terms, and played in 11 matches, 7 in cup competitions and 4 in the National League North, whose season was again ended early because of the COVID-19 pandemic.

Bath City
Holness joined National League South club Bath City on 13 June 2021. His first goal for the club, an 82nd-minute header, secured an FA Cup second qualifying round win against ninth-tier opponents Shaftesbury.

International career
Holness represented Jamaica at both the under-17 and under-20 level. On 5 September 2014, he received his first senior call up to the Jamaica national team.  He made his debut on 9 September in a 3–1 defeat to Canada.

Personal
In February 2018 Holness received a U.S. green card which qualifies him as a domestic player for MLS roster purposes.

References

External links

North Carolina Tar Heels bio

1994 births
Living people
Jamaican footballers
Jamaica international footballers
Jamaica youth international footballers
Association football midfielders
North Carolina Tar Heels men's soccer players
Portland Timbers U23s players
Real Salt Lake players
Real Monarchs players
Philadelphia Union II players
CD San Roque de Lepe footballers
Darlington F.C. players
Bath City F.C. players
Real Salt Lake draft picks
USL League Two players
Major League Soccer players
USL Championship players
Tercera División players
National League (English football) players
2015 CONCACAF Gold Cup players
Jamaican expatriate footballers
Expatriate soccer players in the United States
Expatriate footballers in Spain
Expatriate footballers in England